Sally Ann is an unincorporated community in Rockland Township in Berks County, Pennsylvania, United States. Sally Ann is located at the intersection of Mine and Sally Ann Furnace Roads. It is served by the Mertztown post office with the ZIP code of 19539.

References

Unincorporated communities in Berks County, Pennsylvania
Unincorporated communities in Pennsylvania